The 2021–22 Missouri Tigers men's basketball team represented the University of Missouri in the 2021–22 NCAA Division I men's basketball season and were led by head coach Cuonzo Martin, who was in his fifth year at Missouri. The team played its home games at Mizzou Arena in Columbia, Missouri as a tenth-year members of the Southeastern Conference. They finished the season 12–21, 5–13 in SEC play to finish in 12th place. They defeated Ole Miss in the first round of the SEC tournament before losing to LSU in the second round.

On March 11, 2022, the school fired head coach Cuonzo Martin. On March 22, the school named Cleveland State head coach Dennis Gates the team's new head coach.

Previous season
In a season limited due to the ongoing COVID-19 pandemic the Tigers finish the 2020–21 season 16– 10, 8–8 in SEC play to finish in seventh place. They defeated Georgia in the second round of the SEC tournament before losing to Arkansas. They received an at-large bid to the NCAA tournament as the No. 9 seed in the West Region. There they lost in the First Round to Oklahoma.

Departures
Listed below are players who have entered their names in the Transfer pool and can at anytime remove their name and return to Missouri. Seniors listed below have the option to use their additional year of eligibility.

2021 recruiting class

Incoming Transfers

Roster

Schedule and results

|-
!colspan=12 style=|Non-conference regular Season

|-
!colspan=12 style=|SEC regular Season

|-
!colspan=12 style=| SEC Tournament

See also
2021–22 Missouri Tigers women's basketball team

References

Missouri
Missouri Tigers men's basketball seasons
Missouri Tigers men's basketball
Missouri Tigers men's basketball